The  was a battle during the Azuchi–Momoyama period (16th century) of Japan.
The Battle of Mimaomote was initiated by Chōsokabe commander Kumu Yorinobu with 7,000 men as he advanced into Iyo Province on Shikoku Island.  

There he attacked Doi Kiyonaga, who had crossed the Mimaomote River to engage him. Yorinobu was defeated and killed.

References

Chōsokabe clan
Battles of the Sengoku period
1579 in Japan
Conflicts in 1579